Mr. Simple (reissue name A-Cha) is the fifth studio album by the  South Korean boy band Super Junior. It was released on August 3, 2011, by SM Entertainment, distributed by KMP Holdings and digitally release on August 2. On September 19, 2011, a repackaged edition was released, re-titled A-Cha. It features four new tracks including title track "A-Cha" and "Superman" which was previously released in version B only. This is the group's second album that features ten of the original 13 members and the first being their previous album, Bonamana (2010).

At the year end award shows of 2011, the album won the Disk Daesang Award at the 26th Golden Disk Awards and 21st Seoul Music Awards, as well as the Album of the Year at the 13th Mnet Asian Music Awards. The album, including the repackaged version, is listed as the 2nd best-selling album of the year for 2011. According to Gaon Chart, as of the end of December 2012, the album has sold a cumulative total of 543,623 copies domestically.

Background and development 
On March 31, 2011, leader Leeteuk announced during the interview, "At the earliest, we'll be coming out with our fifth album this summer." Leeteuk and Eunhyuk confirmed on their radio show "Super Junior Kiss the Radio" on June 1, 2011, that they had begun recording their upcoming album that day. Heechul tweeted on June 2, 2011, saying that the group "may be going crazy with preparations for our fifth album, but when it's finally released, you're all going to go mad." American dancer Kenny Wormald posted on his official Twitter on July 11, 2011, that he had started the choreography rehearsal for the group's upcoming new single. On the same day, Leeteuk and Eunhyuk stated on their radio show "Super Junior Kiss the Radio" that songwriter Jinu (hitchhiker) had contributed something for the new album. Shim Jae Won, current choreographer and former member of the disbanded SM group Black Beat tweeted two pictures of the choreography practice of the group showing the lower half of their bodies.

The first of the teaser photos was released on July 20, 2011, featuring Eunhyuk. Other photos followed, in order of: Donghae, Leeteuk, Shindong, Kyuhyun, Sungmin, Ryeowook, Yesung, Siwon and Heechul. On the same day, it was announced that the album is set for an August 3 release.

Music and video 
The album is mostly synthpop, with the title track, "Mr. Simple", being the last installation of the "SJ Funky" genre in which the group has been consistently pursuing since "Sorry, Sorry" (2009) and "Bonamana" (2010). Songs encompassed with synthpop elements include "Opera", "Be My Girl", "Walkin'" and "My Love My Kiss My Heart". Other tracks included in the album are the country-flavored tracks "Good Friends" and "Sunflower", an electropop number "Feels Good", a cover of a 1996 song by Jinu (hitchhiker) entitled "White Christmas", ballads "Storm" and "Memories", a Donghae-Chance-written track "Y", as well as the inclusion of subgroup Super Junior-M's Korean version of their 2011 title track "Perfection", in which it serves a purpose "to give a chance to Korean fans to enjoy the music of Super Junior-M which is appearing in various stages in Asia." Meanwhile, for the B-version of the album, a further-included track "Superman" is described to be "a minimalist hip-hop track which feature the members singing in a low vocal range."

On July 22 to 24, 2011, the group filmed the music video for their new lead single. Two video teasers were released on August 1, 2011, in which the first teaser gained a million views on YouTube a day after its release and 2,500,000 views by the second day. Meanwhile, the second teaser passing a million views by the second day. The music video reached more than half a million views within the first few hours of release. It passed 1.5 million views by the end of the first day, and 3 million by the end of the second, views. Currently, the music video has over 100 million views. On August 26, 2011, a music video for the album's supporting single, "Superman", was released on their YouTube channel, featuring clips from their Super Show 3 Tour as well as the photoshoots and music video making for "Mr. Simple".

On November 1, 2015, the music video officially reached 100 million views on YouTube.

On July 30, 2021, the music video officially reached 200 million views on YouTube.

Promotion and release 
The group held a press conference at the Imperial Palace Hotel in Seoul on August 4, which attracted over 200 reporters, including 70 foreign journalists from Japan, China, Taiwan, Thailand, Hong Kong and Singapore The group expressed that they will promote the album for as long as possible till Heechul's enlistment date and also to continue with Super Show 4 World Tour.

Super Junior had their debut performance of "Mr. Simple" and a non-album track "Superman" at Music Bank on August 5, 2011, followed by Music Core the following day, Inkigayo after that and on August 11 on M! Countdown. However, promotions for the song ended on August 28 due to the enlistment of member Heechul to the army on September 1, 2011.

The album was released in 11 countries across Asia., including Taiwan on September 6, 2011, by Avex Taiwan. The album was supposed to be pre-released in the Philippines by Universal Records on October 1, 2011, but was moved to October 8, citing manufacturing problems caused by typhoon Nesat. The Type A album was officially released in the country on November 24.

After the released of "Mr Simple" in Japanese, the group followed-up with the release of "Opera" in Japanese. The single album also include the travel-themed mid-tempo ballad "Way", Japanese original music video and making-of DVD. It has been available for pre-order from March 11, 2012.

Reception 
The album debuted at number 3 on Billboard World Albums Chart for the week of August 20, 2011. It peaked at number one on the Gaon Album Chart for the month of August, with 287,427 copies sold. Meanwhile, the repackaged album, A-Cha, which was released on September 19, debuted at number three with 97,210 copies sold.

At the year-end list of album sales for 2011, compiled by Gaon Chart, the album is listed as the second best-selling album of the year with 343,348 copies sold and the repackaged version at number seven with 129,894 copies sold. Thus making a cumulative total sale of 473,242 copies in South Korea. On April 12, 2012, Gaon Chart reported that up till the end of March 2012, the album has sold a cumulative total of 502,830 copies, making it the first album in four years to exceed half a million in sales since Kim Gun Mo's eighth album He-story in 2003 and TVXQ's fourth album, Mirotic in 2008. The released in the Philippines on October 8, peaked at number one in Odyssey Weekly Album Chart. After a week of selling the album reached gold status with standout sales of 7,500. This was the group's 5th number one album and 4th album to certify gold status in the country making them the only Korean act to do so.

Track listing

Charts

Release history

Personnel 
Credits are for the Type A of the album, unless where indicated.

 Super Junior - vocals, background vocals
 Leeteuk - vocals, 
 Heechul - vocals , rap
 Yesung - lead vocals, background vocals
 Shindong - vocals, rap
 Sungmin - lead vocals, background vocals
 Eunhyuk - vocals, rap
 Siwon - vocals
 Donghae - vocals, rap
 Ryeowook - lead vocals, background vocals
 Kyuhyun - lead vocals, background vocals
 Super Junior-M - vocals, background vocals (Perfection)
 Zhoumi - vocals
 Henry - vocals, rap
 Yoo Youngjin - background vocals
 Kang Sungho - background vocals
 Park Il - background vocals
 Chance (One Way) - background vocals
 Hitchhiker - background vocals, guitar, keyboard, synth and beat arrangements, bass, sound processing

 Thomas Troelsen - background vocals
 TST - brass section
 Choi Wonhyuk - bass
 Kim Jungbae - guitar
 Lee Hwa - piano
 Yoong - string section
 Shin Seokchul - drums
 Choi Hoon - bass
 Cho Jeongchi - guitar
 Go Gyeongchun - keyboard
 Lee Sungryeol - guitar
 Park Cham - guitar
 Super D - keyboard
 Kim Kyuwon - pro-tools editing
 Goo Jongpil - mixing
 Nam Koongjin - mixing
 Lee Seungho - mixing
 Jeon Hoon - mastering (mastering done at Sonic Korea)

Awards

See also
 Mr. Simple
 
 
 
 
 A-Cha
 
 
 
 
 Superman

References

External links 
 Super Junior official homepage  
 Super Junior official YouTube channel

2011 albums
Super Junior albums
SM Entertainment albums
Grand Prize Golden Disc Award-winning albums
Avex Taiwan albums
Korean-language albums